Nemapogon rileyi is a moth of the family Tineidae. It is found in North America, where it has been recorded from Alabama, Florida, Indiana, Maine, Mississippi, New Jersey, Ohio, South Carolina and Texas.

The wingspan is 13–16 mm. Adults have been recorded on wing year round, but the flight times depend on the location.

References

Moths described in 1905
Nemapogoninae